The 1965 New Zealand Grand Prix was a motor race held at the Pukekohe Park Raceway on 9 January 1965. The race was held over 50 laps of the 3.5 km (2.2 mi) combined circuit for a total distance of 175 km (110 mi). The Grand Prix was run for open wheel racing cars, specifically conforming to either the 2.5 litre Tasman Formula regulations or the 1.6 litre New Zealand National Formula regulations.

It was the 12th New Zealand Grand Prix, doubled as the opening round of the 1965 Tasman Series.  The race attracted 19 starters, including several overseas based drivers and teams. A large contingent of cars from Australia competed, including Frank Gardner competing for Alec Mildren Racing. Lex Davison and Leo Geoghegan brought across their own teams, while 1962 Formula One world champion, British racer Graham Hill race a Brabham for David McKay's Scuderia Veloce team. Star attraction though was the appearance of Team Lotus with their lead driver, 1963 World Champion, Jim Clark. Local honour was upheld by Bruce McLaren, who in an early iteration of the later McLaren team brought a pair of factory supported Coopers to race with American racer, the 1961 World Champion Phil Hill as his number two. The race was won by Graham Hill, his first victory in the NZGP. Gardner finished second to be the first 'antipodean' while first New Zealander was domestic series racer Jim Palmer in a career highlight as Brabham racing cars clean swept the podium.

Classification 
Results as follows:

Notes 
Pole position: Graham Hill
Fastest lap: Graham Hill - 1'26.3

References

New Zealand Grand Prix
Grand Prix
Tasman Series
January 1965 sports events in New Zealand